Motivational enhancement therapy (MET) is a time-limited, four-session adaptation used in Project MATCH, a US-government-funded study of treatment for alcohol problems, and the "Drinkers' Check-up", which provides normative-based feedback and explores client motivation to change in light of the feedback. It is a development of motivational interviewing and motivational therapy. It focuses on the treatment of alcohol and other substance use disorders. The goal of the therapy is not to guide the patient through the recovery process, but to invoke inwardly motivated change. The method has two elements: initial assessment battery session, and two to four individual therapeutic sessions with a therapist. During the first session, the specialist stimulates discussion on the patient's experiences with substance use disorder and elicits self-motivational statements by providing feedback to the initial assessment. The principles of MET are utilized to increase motivation and develop a plan for further change; coping strategies are also presented and talked over with the patient. Changes in the patients behavior are monitored and cessation strategies used are reviewed by the therapist in the subsequent sessions, where patients are encouraged to sustain abstinence and progress.

Process
Motivational enhancement therapy is a strategy of therapy that involves a variation of motivational interviewing to analyze feedback gained from client sessions. Motivational Interviewing was originated by William Miller and Stephen Rollnick based on their experiences treating problem drinkers. The idea of Motivational Interviewing is based on engaging the client to pursue a behavior change. The method revolves around goal making, with assistance from the counselor to help guide the client to that specific set goal. This concept of motivational interviewing later developed into motivational enhancement therapy. The goal of this therapy is to help lead the client to achieve the goals they have set for themselves. Its aim is to provide the client with the opportunity to develop a focus in their life, other than their addiction.

The MET approach is grounded on the transtheoretical perspective that "individuals move through a series of stages of change as they progress in modifying problem behaviors". In understanding change, this concept of stages is notable. Every stage has certain processes used and specific tasks to be accomplished in order to achieve change. MET focuses on motivational strategies using the client's own resources rather then training them through recovery step by step. This approach is very personal to each individual client it is used with, centered around the main goal of evoking change.

Patients/Clients
Addicts are one of the primary populations motivational enhancement therapy lends an aid to. The therapist works closely with the client to help create an inner willingness to fight their addiction. Unlike other therapy or counseling programs that offer a step-by-step process, MET focuses on creating an internally motivated change. A typical therapy session consists of an initial assessment, and two to four treatment sessions with the therapist. In the initial session, the therapist conducts a discussion about the client’s substance use. They encourage the use of self-motivational statements through Motivational Interviewing. It is in this first session where a plan for change is established between the therapist and client. The following sessions are based around achieving that plan.

MET has become increasingly effective. As it is rooted in the idea of self-motivation, those who seek help genuinely want it. It is also known by the National Institute on Alcohol Abuse and Alcoholism (NIAAA) to be one of the most cost-effective methods available.

Key components
There are 5 key components to motivational enhancement therapy:
Express empathy – therapists seek to build trust and respect with the patient, making sure that each individual knows that the decision to change is ultimately up to him/her. The therapist acts as both a "supportive companion and knowledgeable consultant" in meetings.
Develop discrepancy – Clients attention is enhanced and focused on discrepancies. Raising a clients awareness of personal consequences brings about a motivation for change, allowing the client to willingly discuss options to change "in order to reduce the perceived discrepancy and regain emotional equilibrium".
Avoid argument – Arguments will be avoided and not engaged in. Therapists use strategies to help clients see true consequences and reduce the "perceived positive aspects" of behaviors, such as drinking alcohol.
Rolling with resistance – As resistance of some kind will exist. MET encourages that the therapist "roll with" these resistances, "with a goal of shifting clients perceptions". Rather than therapists providing solutions, they are usually "evoked from the client".
Support self-efficacy – Self-efficacy is defined as the way people view their own competence and achieve their own goals. Therapists encourage clients to realize they are capable of many things, including having the strength to give up alcohol.

References

Sources
 Miller, W. R. (2000) Motivational Enhancement Therapy: Description of Counseling Approach. in Boren, J. J. Onken, L. S., & Carroll, K. M. (Eds.) Approaches to Drug Abuse Counseling, US Department of Health and Human Services; NIH Publication No. 00-4151 edition (2000)
 Miller, W.R. and Rollnick, S. Motivational Interviewing: Preparing People for Change. NY: Guilford Press, 2002.  
 Miller, W.R., Zweben, A., DiClemente, C.C., Rychtarik, R.G. (1994) 'Motivational Enhancement Therapy Manual. Washington, DC:National Institute on Alcohol Abuse and Alcoholism, Project MATCH Monograph Series, Volume 2.    

Motivation
Psychotherapies
Alcohol and health
Substance-related disorders